Evgeniya Alexandrovna Ovchinnikova (born 7 April 1985) is a Russian Olympic eventing rider. She competed at the 2016 Summer Olympics in Rio de Janeiro, where she withdrew during the individual competition and placed 13th in the team competition.

References

Living people
1985 births
Russian female equestrians
Equestrians at the 2016 Summer Olympics
Olympic equestrians of Russia